Stade de la Concorde is a stadium located in Bukavu, Democratic Republic of the Congo.  It has a seating capacity of 10,000 spectators.  It serves as the home of OC Muungano of the Linafoot.

External links
Stadium information

Football venues in the Democratic Republic of the Congo
Bukavu